"Back to You" is the second single, released on March 7, 2014, from Mandisa's fourth album, Overcomer.

Composition
"Back to You" is originally in the key of E Major, with a tempo of 93 beats per minute. Written in common time, Mandisa's vocal range spans from B3 to G#5 during the song.

Charts

Weekly charts

Year-end charts

References 

2014 singles
2014 songs
Mandisa songs
Sparrow Records singles
Songs written by Ben Glover
Songs written by David Garcia (musician)